Speechmatics is a technology company based in Cambridge, England, which develops automatic speech recognition software (ASR) based on recurrent neural networks and statistical language modelling. Speechmatics was originally named Cantab Research Ltd when founded in 2006 by speech recognition specialist Dr. Tony Robinson.

Speechmatics Ltd became the trading name of Cantab Research Ltd in 2012 when the company commercialized. Speechmatics offers its speech recognition for solution and service providers to integrate into their stack regardless of their industry or use case. Businesses use Speechmatics to understand and transcribe human-level speech into text regardless of any gender or demographic barrier. The technology can be deployed on-premises and in public and private cloud.

History
Speechmatics was founded in 2006 by Tony Robinson who pioneered in the application of recurrent neural networks to speech recognition. He was one of the early people who has discovered the practical capabilities of deep neural networks and how they can be used to benefit speech recognition. In 2012, Cantab Research Ltd commercialized its speech recognition product and started selling the technology to customers as Speechmatics Ltd.

In 2014, the company led the development of a billion-word text corpus for measuring progress in statistical language modelling and placed the corpus into the public domain to help accelerate the development of speech recognition technology.

In 2017, the company announced they had developed a new computational method for creating new language models at speed. Around the same time Speechmatics announced a partnership with Qatar Computing Research Institute (QCRI) to develop advanced Arabic speech to text services.

In 2018, Speechmatics became the first ASR provider to develop a Global English language pack which incorporates all dialects and accents of English into one single model.

In 2019, the company raised £6.35 million in venture capital investment in a Series A funding round. With investment from Albion Venture Capital, IQ Capital, and Amadeus Capital Partners, Speechmatics were able to scale into a fast-growth technology start-up. In the same year, the company wins a Queen's Award for Innovation.

In 2020, Speechmatics began scaling beyond its product development and into physical geographic locations. The company opened offices in Brno, Czech Republic, Denver, USA and Chennai, India.

In March 2021, Speechmatics announced its launch on the Microsoft Azure Marketplace to offer any-context speech recognition technology at scale. The ability to consume Speechmatics’ speech recognition engine directly in the Microsoft Azure technology stack enables businesses to start using the technology quickly without barriers to adoption.

In December 2021, Speechmatics and consumer AI startup Personal.ai announced their partnership to offer individuals a personal AI that empower them to never forget their conversations, spoken notes, reminders, details of what they said during a meeting, and more — no matter the dialect of English that they use or accent that they carry.

Product and services
In February 2018, Speechmatics launched Global English, a single English language pack supporting all major English accents for use in speech-to-text transcription. Global English (GE) was trained through spoken data by users from 40 countries and billions of words drawn from global sources, making it comprehensive and accurate accent-agnostic transcription solutions on the market.

In November 2020, the company launched the first Global Spanish language pack on the market that supports all major Spanish accents. Global Spanish (GS) is a single Spanish language pack trained on data drawn across a wide range of diverse sources – specifically those from Latin America – making it the most accurate and comprehensive accent-independent Spanish language pack for speech-to-text.

In October 2021, Speechmatics launched its ‘Autonomous Speech Recognition’ software. Using the latest techniques in deep learning and with the introduction of its breakthrough self-supervised models, Speechmatics outperforms Amazon, Apple, Google, and Microsoft in the company's latest step towards its mission to understand all voices.

Awards and recognition
Speechmatics was named in the FT 1000: Europe's Fastest Growing Companies list for consecutive four years from 2019 to 2022.

In 2018, the company won SME National Business Awards in High Growth Business of the Year.

In 2019, Speechmatics won 2019 Queen's Award for Enterprise in Innovation category.

References

Technology companies of England
Companies based in Cambridge
Speech recognition software
British companies established in 2006